Roman Yevgenyevich Pukhov (born 7 December 2000) is a Russian football player. He plays for FC Znamya Noginsk.

Club career
He played for PFC CSKA Moscow in the 2017–18 UEFA Youth League.

He made his debut in the Russian Football National League for FC Fakel Voronezh on 7 July 2019 in a game against FC Torpedo Moscow.

References

External links
 Profile by Russian Football National League
 
 
 

2000 births
Sportspeople from Ivanovo
Living people
Russian footballers
Association football midfielders
PFC CSKA Moscow players
FC Dynamo Moscow reserves players
FC Fakel Voronezh players